In the military science of ballistics, circular error probable (CEP) (also circular error probability or circle of equal probability) is a measure of a weapon system's precision. It is defined as the radius of a circle, centered on the mean, whose perimeter is expected to include the landing points of 50% of the rounds; said otherwise, it is the median error radius. That is, if a given munitions design has a CEP of 100 m, when 100 munitions are targeted at the same point, 50 will fall within a circle with a radius of 100 m around their average impact point. (The distance between the target point and the average impact point is referred to as bias.)

There are associated concepts, such as the DRMS (distance root mean square), which is the square root of the average squared distance error, and R95, which is the radius of the circle where 95% of the values would fall in.

The concept of CEP also plays a role when measuring the accuracy of a position obtained by a navigation system, such as GPS or older systems such as LORAN and Loran-C.

Concept

The original concept of CEP was based on a circular bivariate normal distribution (CBN) with CEP as a parameter of the CBN just as μ and σ are parameters of the normal distribution. Munitions with this distribution behavior tend to cluster around the mean impact point, with most reasonably close, progressively fewer and fewer further away, and very few at long distance. That is, if CEP is n metres, 50% of shots land within n metres of the mean impact, 43.7% between n and 2n, and 6.1% between 2n and 3n metres, and the proportion of shots that land farther than three times the CEP from the mean is only 0.2%.

CEP is not a good measure of accuracy when this distribution behavior is not met. Precision-guided munitions generally have more "close misses" and so are not normally distributed. Munitions may also have larger standard deviation of range errors than the standard deviation of azimuth (deflection) errors, resulting in an elliptical confidence region. Munition samples may not be exactly on target, that is, the mean vector will not be (0,0). This is referred to as bias.

To incorporate accuracy into the CEP concept in these conditions, CEP can be defined as the square root of the mean square error (MSE). The MSE will be the sum of the variance of the range error plus the variance of the azimuth error plus the covariance of the range error with the azimuth error plus the square of the bias. Thus the MSE results from pooling all these sources of error, geometrically corresponding to radius of a circle within which 50% of rounds will land.

Several methods have been introduced to estimate CEP from shot data. Included in these methods are the plug-in approach of Blischke and Halpin (1966), the Bayesian approach of Spall and Maryak (1992), and the maximum likelihood approach of Winkler and Bickert (2012). The Spall and Maryak approach applies when the shot data represent a mixture of different projectile characteristics (e.g., shots from multiple munitions types or from multiple locations directed at one target).

Conversion
While 50% is a very common definition for CEP, the circle dimension can be defined for percentages. Percentiles can be determined by recognizing that the horizontal position error is defined by a 2D vector which components are two orthogonal Gaussian random variables (one for each axis), assumed uncorrelated, each having a standard deviation . The distance error is the magnitude of that vector; it is a property of 2D Gaussian vectors that the magnitude follows the Rayleigh distribution, with a standard deviation , called the distance root mean square (DRMS). In turn, the properties of the Rayleigh distribution are that its percentile at level  is given by the following formula:

or, expressed in terms of the DRMS:

We can then derive a conversion table to convert values expressed for one percentile level, to another. Said conversion table, giving the coefficients  to convert  into , is given by:

For example, a GPS receiver having a 1.25 m DRMS will have a 1.25 m1.73 = 2.16 m 95% radius.

Warning: often, sensor datasheets or other publications state "RMS" values which in general, but not always, stand for "DRMS" values. Also, be wary of habits coming from properties of a 1D normal distribution, such as the 68-95-99.7 rule, in essence trying to say that "R95 = 2DRMS". As shown above, these properties simply do not translate to the distance errors. Finally, mind that these values are obtained for a theoretical distribution; while generally being true for real data, these may be affected by other effects, which the model does not represent.

See also
 Probable error

References

Further reading

 
 
 Grubbs, F. E. (1964). "Statistical measures of accuracy for riflemen and missile engineers". Ann Arbor, ML: Edwards Brothers. Ballistipedia pdf
 
 Daniel Wollschläger (2014), "Analyzing shape, accuracy, and precision of shooting results with shotGroups".  Reference manual for shotGroups
 Winkler, V. and Bickert, B. (2012). "Estimation of the circular error probability for a Doppler-Beam-Sharpening-Radar-Mode," in EUSAR. 9th European Conference on Synthetic Aperture Radar, pp. 368–71, 23/26 April 2012. ieeexplore.ieee.org

External links
 Circular Error Probable in Ballistipedia

Applied probability
Military terminology
Aerial bombs
Artillery operation
Ballistics
Weapon guidance
Accuracy and precision
Statistical distance